Judith Josefina Castillo Uribe born in Caracas, Venezuela on June 16, 1958. Won the 1976 Miss Venezuela contest, representing Nueva Esparta, after Elluz Peraza, of Guárico had resigned only two days after her victory. Castillo was the official representative of Venezuela to the Miss Universe 1976 pageant held in  Hong Kong on July 11, 1976; when she won the title of 1st Runner Up.

References

External links
Miss Venezuela Official Website
Miss Universe Official Website

1958 births
Living people
Miss Universe 1976 contestants
Miss Venezuela winners
People from Caracas